Pugled pri Karlovici is a small settlement in the Municipality of Ribnica in southern Slovenia. It lies in the traditional region of Lower Carniola and is now included in the Southeast Slovenia Statistical Region.

Name
The name of the settlement was changed from Pugled to Pugled pri Karlovici (literally, 'Pugled near Karlovica') in 1953. The name Pugled is derived from the Slovene word pogled 'bare hill with an open view' and referred to a landscape feature.

References

External links
Pugled pri Karlovici on Geopedia

Populated places in the Municipality of Ribnica